Daniel Chris Putnam (born September 17, 1982) is an American former professional baseball outfielder. He played in Major League Baseball (MLB) for the Oakland Athletics.

Career

Amateur
As a student at Rancho Bernardo High School in 2001, he was named the USA Today California High School Player of the Year. He attended Stanford University, and in 2002 he played collegiate summer baseball with the Hyannis Mets of the Cape Cod Baseball League where he was named a league all-star. He was selected by the A's in the first round of the 2004 MLB Draft.

Oakland Athletics
He played parts of three seasons in the minors for the Athletics. In 2004 he played for the Low-A Vancouver Canadians and the Single-A Kane County Cougars. In 2005 he played for High-A Stockton Ports and in 2006 he played for Stockton and the Double-A Midland RockHounds. He was called up to the majors in April . He made his major league debut on April 23, 2007 against the Baltimore Orioles, and got his first major league hit the same day. Putnam returned to the minors in May 2007 when Milton Bradley returned from an injury. May 10, 2007 would be his final major league appearance.

He was designated for assignment on January 11, 2008, and started the year playing for their Triple-A affiliate, the Sacramento River Cats and would end up playing 89 games for Sacramento during the season. In 2009, Putnam played for Sacramento and Midland for the Athletics organization.

San Diego Padres
On July 8, 2009, Putnam was traded to the San Diego Padres as the player to be named later in the Chad Reineke trade that had occurred on April 2. He would finish the 2009 season with the Padres Triple-A affiliate, the Portland Beavers. Putnam was released by the Padres organization on March 25, 2010.

Bridgeport Bluefish
Following his release from the Padres, Putnam signed with the Bridgeport Bluefish of the independent Atlantic League for the 2010 season. He played in 108 games for Bridgeport, hitting .272/.367/.448 to go along with 11 homers and 56 runs batted in. In 2011 for the Bluefish, Putnam slashed .270/.331/.420 over 105 games. He became a free agent after the season.

References

External links

1982 births
Living people
American expatriate baseball players in Canada
Arizona League Athletics players
Baseball players at the 2003 Pan American Games
Baseball players from Illinois
Bridgeport Bluefish players
Hyannis Harbor Hawks players
Kane County Cougars players
Major League Baseball outfielders
Midland RockHounds players
Oakland Athletics players
Pan American Games medalists in baseball
Pan American Games silver medalists for the United States
People from St. Clair County, Illinois
Portland Beavers players
Sacramento River Cats players
Stanford Cardinal baseball players
Stockton Ports players
United States national baseball team players
Vancouver Canadians players
Medalists at the 2003 Pan American Games
Rancho Bernardo High School alumni
Águilas de Mexicali players
American expatriate baseball players in Mexico